Bluebonnet or blue bonnet may refer to:

 Blue Bonnet (brand), a brand of margarine and other bread spreads and baking fats
 Blue bonnet (hat), a type of soft woollen hat
 Blue Bonnets (raceway), a horse racing track and casino in Montreal, Quebec, Canada
 "Blue Bonnets O'er the Border", a regimental march of the King's Own Scottish Borderers
 Bluebonnet (bird), two species of Australian parrots in the genus Northiella
 Bluebonnet (plant), a name given to any number of blue-flowered species of the genus Lupinus